Tswapong may refer to:
Tswapong Hills, a mountain range in Botswana
Tswapong language, a Bantu language of Botswana
Tswapong, name of one of the Tswana minorities
Tswapong North and Tswapong South, two of the Parliamentary constituencies of Botswana